Chen Wenqing (born 24 January 1960) is a Chinese intelligence officer, politician and member of the Politburo of the Chinese Communist Party who currently serves as the secretary of the Central Political and Legal Affairs Commission. He previously served as the Minister of State Security.

Early life and education
A native of Renshou County, a rural farming and coal-mining district in Sichuan province, Chen's childhood occurred against the backdrop of the Cultural Revolution and the rise of the Red Guards movement.

His father was a police officer at the Sichuan branch of the Ministry of Public Security (MPS), where for 20 consecutive years, starting in 1951, the elder Chen was recognized as a Sichuan Province "progressive worker" by communist officials. There are no records publicly available about the elder Chen's role, if any, in the Cultural Revolution, and the names of both Chen's mother and father remain unknown.

Chen studied law and political science at Southwest University in Chongqing from September 1980 through August 1984. He joined the Chinese Communist Party in March 1983. He returned to school in March 1995, completing a postgraduate program in business management from Sichuan University in October 1997.

Public Security career 
Following his father, Chen entered the Ministry of Public Security in July 1984, beginning his service as an ordinary policeman at the Xiejia Town Police Station in the Pengshan District Public Security Bureau, in Meishan, Sichuan Province. Some accounts suggest Chen's early police work involved a particular focus on counterfeiting. By late 1986 he was deputy director of the Public Security Bureau in Jinkouhe District, a closed city in the prefecture-level city of Leshan, Sichuan Province, home to the Heping gaseous diffusion plant (Plant 814) of Sichuan Honghua Industrial Corporation which produces high-enriched Uranium.

From December 1986 to June 1990, Chen was Deputy Director and then Director of the Public Security Branch of Wutongqiao District, another district of Leshan. In that time he was decorated for bravery for his role in stopping two armed fugitives. On November 8, 1988, Shao Jiangbin and Geng Xuejie, deserters from the Hubei province People's Armed Police, took stolen Type 56 assault rifles and thousands of rounds of ammunition and began a three day murder spree through Hubei and Shaanxi to Sichuan. After a pursuit involving 1,516 soldiers and police officers, the "Baiyangou Bandits" were finally cornered by police during a nighttime standoff in a dimly lit area, when Chen reportedly left cover in order to climb behind a rock in an exposed position near where the pair were hiding, and installed searchlights to prevent them from escaping into the dark again. Both fugitives were killed by police during the shootout. At the end of the year, Chen was selected as an "excellent police chief" of the year by superiors.

In June 1990 he became Deputy Director of the Leshan Public Security Bureau (PSB), promoted to director in December 1992.

Transfer to the Ministry of State Security 
In 1994, Chen was transferred to the Ministry of State Security (MSS), becoming deputy director of the Sichuan provincial State Security Department (SSD), likely as a founding member of what was a newly established department created in the third of four waves of MSS expansion. For many Public Security Bureau officers at the time of Chen's transfer to the Sichuan SSD, "they were police one day and state security the next."

From January 1997 to January 1998, Chen was deputy director, deputy secretary and secretary of the Party Leadership Group at the Sichuan SSD. In January 1998, Chen took over leadership of the Sichuan SSD, and secretary of the Party Leadership Group. That September he also took up the role of deputy secretary-general of the provincial government. He stayed on as Sichuan SSD head until April 2002, when he was appointed chief prosecutor at the Sichuan provincial People's Procuratorate.

Procuratorship and anticorruption 
In April 2004, Chen became more involved in legal affairs, first serving as chief prosecutor of the Sichuan Provincial People's Procuratorate before leaving Sichuan for Fujian in August 2006, becoming both deputy secretary of the Fujian Provincial Party Committee and secretary of the Provincial Commission for Discipline Inspection. His public profile began to increase in this position, holding interviews with state media about his "anti-corruption concept" as early as 2008. By 2012 he was talking publicly in Fujian about a need to investigate the loyalties and intents of Taiwanese businesses in the cross-straight province.

While at the CCDI, Chen helped lead the "tiger hunt" (a reference to the fact Mao once called South China tigers the "enemies of man" and drove them to near-extinction) against public corruption.

At the 18th National Congress of the Chinese Communist Party (CCP) in November 2012, Xi Jinping became General Secretary of the Communist Party, and Chen moved to Beijing to become deputy secretary and member of the standing committee of the 18th Central Commission for Discipline Inspection, both roles he retained until May 2015.

Chen's activities during the year between his departure from CCDI in May 2015 and his appointment as party secretary of the MSS in October 2016 are entirely unclear.

PLA commissar 
From January 2012 to April 2013, Chen served as political commissar of a reserve anti-aircraft artillery division of the People's Liberation Army (PLA) Ground Force in Fujian province. Fujian is located directly across the strait from Taiwan, and is the garrison of Eastern Theater Command (previously Nanjing Military Region), charged with maintaining security in the East China Sea and the conduct of major operations against Taiwan. "Fujian experience" is considered especially prestigious, and a key prerequisite in the career track of many senior Communist Party officials and PLA officers.

Minister of State Security 
In 2016 command of the MSS was split between outgoing Minister of State Security Geng Huichang, and Chen as new Party Secretary. Geng was due to retire, but before leaving he was placed under investigation. Chen appointed Tang Chao as a "special agent" to look into claims that Geng had used MSS technical means to monitor the communications of senior communist party officials, including Hu Jintao and Xi Jinping. Ultimately Geng was exonerated when the CCDI concluded that Zhou Yongkang had circumvented MSS leadership, including head of Counterintelligence Liang Ke.

Despite no longer being blamed for the breach, Xi Jinping chose to replace Geng with Chen anyway, clearing the way for a slate of reforms meant to reduce MSS influence, and increase the influence of the First Bureau of the Ministry of Public Security, which also conducts foreign intelligence operations. There had already been a major shakeup of MSS regional offices underway before Chen's appointment, reportedly on the direction of Xi Jinping himself. Under Chen's new leadership "arrests and purges began to multiply rapidly."

Chen was appointed Party Secretary of the MSS in October 2016 and Minister of State Security on 7 November 2016. He began by investigating and arresting his college friend and MSS counterintelligence head Ma Jian, reportedly as a test to prove his loyalty to the Xi Jinping faction.

Belt and Road Initiative 
In early 2018, Chen's MSS was given responsibility for the security of all Belt and Road Initiative (BRI) projects across 28 participating countries, after a lengthy fight for control against the Ministry of Public Security, CCP security coordinator Meng Jianzhu. In response, Chen led efforts to build stronger relations with Asian allies such as U Thaung Tun, Myanmar's National Security Advisor, and General Tô Lâm, current Minister of Public Security of Vietnam. Soon after the MSS' selection for the program, Chen met with the heads of the intelligence services of Saudi Arabia, Pakistan, Spain, Germany and Turkey. Intelligence Online reported that Chen sought to strengthen MSS efforts in island nations that are crossed by the maritime component of the BRI, such as the Seychelles and the Maldives, in an effort to counter Indian influence, and deepen cooperation with the Turkish National Intelligence Organization (MİT), key to the MSS' efforts to identify Uyghur jihadists which remain a top concern of senior Chinese officials.

Hong Kong national security law 
In 2020, Chen presided over a meeting of the Party Committee of the MSS regarding implementation of the Hong Kong national security law. Days after the law's passage, Chen and his ministry pledged to aid authorities in Hong Kong in its implementation.

Collapse of Afghanistan 
Following the Summer 2021 US withdrawal from Afghanistan, Chen reportedly met directly with acting Taliban interior minister Sirajuddin Haqqani in Kabul several times as China increased support to Taliban intelligence operations. He later joined senior intelligence officials from Russia, Iran and Tajikistan at a summit led by LTG Faiz Hameed, chief of Pakistan's ISI, to explore regional stability concerns among the participants as the Islamic Republic of Afghanistan began to collapse.

Replacement 
In late February 2018, Reuters reported that five sources including two foreign diplomats confirmed to them that Chen was going to be replaced by Wang Xiaohong in the session of parliament beginning 5 March 2018. Wang was instead made Deputy Minister of Public Security at the meeting, and promoted to Minister of Public Security in November 2021, while Chen continued to lead the MSS. On October 30, 2022, Chen was succeeded by Chen Yixin.

National leadership 
At the 20th National Congress in October 2022, Chen was made a member of the Politburo and Central Secretariat. As the only member of the Politburo with a background in state security, Chen was made head of the Central Political and Legal Affairs Commission, succeeding Guo Shengkun. John P. Burns, emeritus professor of politics at the University of Hong Kong, said Chen's appointment signaled the party's insecurity both internationally with a more contentious relationship with the US and Europe, and domestically on issues related to Xinjiang, Tibet, and other cities.

Publications 

 Firmly Establish and Practice the Overall National Security Concept and Write a New Chapter of National Security in the New Era, Qiushi, April 2022.

References 

1960 births
Living people
Ministers of State Security of the People's Republic of China
Members of the 20th Politburo of the Chinese Communist Party
Chinese Communist Party politicians from Sichuan
People's Republic of China politicians from Sichuan
Politicians from Meishan